"Funny" is a song by German-Russian music producer Zedd and English singer Jasmine Thompson. The two artists wrote the song with Michael Pollack and Casey Smith, as well as Jordan K. Johnson, Marcus Lomax and Stefan Johnson from the American production and songwriting team The Monsters & Strangerz, who produced the song with Zedd. It was released on 16 July 2020 by Atlantic Records and Interscope Records.

Background
Thompson wrote the song in summer 2019. Since she is based in London, she went to Los Angeles for a weekend to work on the song with her team of producers, The Monsters & Strangerz. Due to the COVID-19 pandemic, she flew back home and did everything online afterwards. The Monsters & Strangerz secretly got in touch with Zedd and provided him with an early demo they produced without Thompson's knowledge. Zedd loved it, produced his version and reached out to her through her manager about the collaboration.

In an interview with Kansas City CBS affiliate KCTV5, Thompson said she initially envisioned that song to be sadder and piano-driven, but once Zedd sent her his version, it instantly won her over. Without the negativity, the track has transformed into a happy, feel-good revenge song. "He really put his own spin on Funny, and made it a much more hopeful song then I had originally understood the song," she said, adding that "the idea of collaborating with him was life-changing".

In a press statement, Zedd said that he was "blown away" when he first heard Thompson's vocals on the song, and immediately knew he wanted to work with her. He praised Thompson for capturing the vast amount of emotion and energy in the song perfectly with her voice. Thompson called the collaboration "an amazing experience", praising Zedd's "unique" approach, which "gave the song an incredible energy, and really brought it to life".

Release
An acoustic version of the song premiered on Thompson's YouTube channel on 14 July 2020. During a Twitter conversation with Billboard Dance, Zedd revealed that he had already finished the song in late February 2020, but he faced difficulty in finding an appropriate time to release the single "given the difficult state the world [was] in". The official stripped version was released on 14 August 2020, while a remix EP was released on 4 September 2020, featuring remixes by Breathe Carolina, Marc Benjamin and Ellis.

Composition
"Funny" is an upbeat dance-pop and pop song about a breakup. It opens with a piano and vocal arpeggiator, accompanied by a clock-ticking effect, a signature feature in Zedd's productions. Thompson's vocals are layered over vocoder effect, which bears a resemblance to past tracks from Zedd such as "The Middle" and "Stay". The drop has been described as futurepop, and features a distorted vocal chop melody and sawtooth synth chords. Lyrically, the track centers on revenge through confidence when an ex-lover reaches out after a breakup.

Thompson spoke of the idea behind the song in a press statement: "After a relationship, people always seem to come back and want to try again and pay you more attention and say they miss you. I had been through a relationship that wasn't working and as soon as we ended it, they wanted to spend more time with me." She said the song is not about a specific ex in particular.

In an interview with Paper, Zedd said that the song was especially challenging to produce since the original chorus was a double chorus. "I usually go with my typical formula that has a chorus, then I have the chorus again, slight variation, then the third time I would have a double chorus, but this song has a double chorus from the get-go." To prevent separating the message of the whole chorus or revealing the message too soon, Zedd made a drop with a hint of lyrics through a vocal chop, while the bridge reveals the full lyrics to the double chorus. In this song, the bridge acts as a climax rather than a space filler. He decided that this was the best approach after he made about 20 versions.

Music video
The music video was released on YouTube on 16 July 2020. The two artists had originally planned to meet in person in Los Angeles to work on the music video. However, due to the onset of the pandemic, Thompson was not able to travel. Instead, they came up with a new idea for the video which made it especially relevant to the moment. With no set crews or camera operators, the shoot was coordinated through FaceTime.

The music video involves screen recordings of Mac computers running macOS Catalina, and it takes place almost entirely in the Messages app. It opens with Thompson recording herself singing the chorus while playing the piano in Photo Booth, as if she was recording a demo, until she received an iMessage from her ex-boyfriend. She proceeds to type the lyrics into the text field. She subsequently received a message from Zedd, who called her voice "incredible" and wanted to work with her, saying he got her number from Scottish singer-songwriter Lewis Capaldi. At first, she did not believe it, until he sends her a picture, after which she typed: "OMG it is u!". She responded by sending him the demo she recorded earlier, and later joined a Zoom meeting with Zedd and his dogs. Near the end of the video, Capaldi makes a shirtless cameo, lip-syncing to the song while shoving potato chips into his mouth.

Track listing
 Digital download and streaming
 "Funny" – 3:41

 Digital download and streaming – stripped
 "Funny" (stripped) – 3:39

 Digital download and streaming – remixes EP
 "Funny" (Breathe Carolina remix) – 3:21
 "Funny" (Marc Benjamin remix) – 2:55
 "Funny" (Ellis remix) – 2:34
 "Funny" – 3:41

Credits and personnel
Credits adapted from Tidal.

 Zedd – songwriting, production, mixing, programming
 Jasmine Thompson – vocals, songwriting
 Casey Smith – additional vocals, songwriting
 The Monsters & Strangerz – production, guitar, programming
 Jordan K. Johnson – songwriting
 Marcus Lomax – songwriting
 Stefan Johnson – songwriting
 Michael Pollack – songwriting
 Joya Nemley – A&R administration
 Brandon Davis – A&R direction
 Pete Ganbarg – A&R direction
 Gian Stone – vocal production, audio engineering
 Ryan Shanahan – audio engineering
 Mike Marsh – mastering
 Joe Kearns – vocal production

Charts

Weekly charts

Year-end charts

Certifications

Release history

References

External links
 
 

2020 singles
2020 songs
Zedd songs
Dance-pop songs
Pop ballads
Songs written by Zedd
Songs written by Jordan Johnson (songwriter)
Songs written by Marcus Lomax
Songs written by Michael Pollack (musician)
Songs written by Stefan Johnson
Song recordings produced by the Monsters & Strangerz
Future bass songs
Atlantic Records singles
Interscope Records singles